The Deputy Leader of the House of the Maharashtra Legislative Assembly is the deputy to the Leader of the House Devendra Fadnavis is the current Deputy Leader of the House of the Maharashtra Legislative Assembly as the Deputy Chief Minister of Maharashtra.

Deputy Leader of the House
 
The Assembly has a Deputy Leader of the House, who heads the government caucus. The office is provided for in the Legislative Assembly Rules, which defines it as "Chief Minister or any other Minister appointed by Chief Minister". The Rules further mandate that the Chairperson should conduct parliamentary business in consultation with the Leader.

References

Lists of Indian civil servants